Hastingues is a commune in the Landes department in Nouvelle-Aquitaine in southwestern France. Its nickname, due to its location on a rounded-shaped hill, is Lou Carcolh (the snail).

Geography 
The town lies on a hill looking over the valley of the Gaves réunis, in the Gascon region and bordering on the Basque Country.

History 
The bastide was founded in 1289 by John Hastings, seneschal of Gascony, who signed a treaty of coregency in the name of Edward I of England between the king, Duke of Aquitaine and the monks of Arthous abbey.

The work on the gate was started in 1289, but the town wall still was not complete in the 15th century.

The houses of Jurats and Sénéchal were built in the same century.

Population

References

See also
Communes of the Landes department
Lou Carcolh

Communes of Landes (department)